Frederick George Jacob Hahn (3 November 1911 – 5 February 1963) was a Social Credit party member of the House of Commons of Canada. He was born in Killaly, Saskatchewan and became a business executive, merchant, principal and teacher by career.

He was first elected at the New Westminster riding in the 1953 general election. He was re-elected there for a second and final term in the 1957 election. In 1958, Hahn was defeated by William McLennan of the Progressive Conservative party.

Hahn ran to succeed Solon Low at the 1961 Social Credit leadership convention but came in third. A few weeks prior to the convention, he unsuccessfully campaigned for another Parliament seat in a 29 May 1961 by-election at Esquimalt—Saanich. He placed fourth with 19% of the vote. He subsequently ran unsuccessfully in the 1962 election at Vancouver Centre.

References

External links
 

1911 births
1963 deaths
Members of the House of Commons of Canada from British Columbia
Social Credit Party of Canada MPs
Canadian merchants